Robert White (1688 – 1752) was an early American physician, military officer, pioneer, and planter in the Colony of Virginia.

White was born in Scotland, the son of John White, a physician practicing in Paisley, Renfrewshire. He studied medicine at the University of Edinburgh, and later served as a surgeon with the rank of captain in the Royal Navy of the Kingdom of Great Britain. He relocated to the Thirteen Colonies between 1720 and 1730, first to Delaware, then Pennsylvania, and finally as a "pioneer settler" in present-day Frederick County, Virginia between 1732 and 1735. White was one of two physicians practicing in Frederick County, and conducted his practice from his residence near Great North Mountain. White was part of a larger wave of Scottish physicians who settled in Virginia prior to the American Revolutionary War.

White was the progenitor of the White political family of Virginia and West Virginia. He was the father of Alexander White (1738–1804), United States House Representative, and the grandfather of Virginia judge Robert White (1759–1831) and United States House Representative Francis White (1761–1826).

Early life and education
Robert White was born in Scotland in 1688. He was the son of John White, a physician practicing in Paisley, Renfrewshire who died in 1742. White's lineage was of both Scottish and English origins, descending from Covenanters, a Scottish Presbyterian movement during the 17th century. He studied medicine at the University of Edinburgh in Edinburgh, Scotland, and graduated with a Doctor of Medicine degree from the institution.

Royal Navy service
Following the completion of his education, White served as a surgeon with the rank of captain in the Royal Navy of the Kingdom of Great Britain. While it is not known for certain why White resigned his commission, White family tradition held that he left the Royal Navy after he engaged in a duel with another officer.

Arrival in America
White was the first member of his family to travel to and reside in America. Between 1720 and 1730, White arrived in the British Colonies where he visited his uncle William Hoge (an ancestor of United States House of Representatives member John Blair Hoge) residing in Delaware Colony. White fell in love with Hoge's eldest daughter Margaret and he married her in Delaware Colony. White's marriage to Margaret was likely the cause of his resignation from the Royal Navy. He and Margaret, along with her father William Hoge, relocated near York, Pennsylvania where White erected a residence he named "White Hall" after his family's ancestral home in Scotland.

Settlement in Virginia
From York, White relocated between 1732 and 1735 as a "pioneer settler" to a stream along Great North Mountain near Winchester in Orange County, Virginia (later included as part of Frederick County following its 1738 creation), where he established a plantation. During this move to Virginia, White was accompanied by his elderly father-in-law William Hoge, who settled three miles south of Winchester on Opequon Creek. White was one of the earlier pioneer settlers of Frederick County. White and Hoge, along with other families, established the Opequon Meeting House, the oldest Presbyterian congregation formed west of the Blue Ridge Mountains.

White "staked out" his farm between 1732 and 1735 consisting of  along Hogue Creek, south of the present-day unincorporated community of Hayfield, Virginia along U.S. Route 50. White's land tract was surveyed by John Mauzy on 22 April 1751, and he was issued a formal land grant from Thomas Fairfax, 6th Lord Fairfax of Cameron on 15 November 1754. Mauzy's survey stated that White had been residing on the land tract since at least 1751. White established his permanent residence on this land grant, which became the ancestral home of the White family of Virginia and West Virginia.

White was one of two physicians practicing in Frederick County along with Daniel Hart (died about 1748). White practiced from his residence near Great North Mountain, and one of his more notable patients was Colonel James Wood, founder of Winchester, Virginia. White's son Alexander married Wood's daughter, Elizabeth Wood. White was part a larger wave of Scottish physicians who settled in Virginia prior to the American Revolutionary War. White's alma mater, the University of Edinburgh, was a leading center of medical education and research, and the school trained more physicians than were needed in Scotland. Unlike White, the majority of Scottish physicians practiced in the main centers of population in the colonial port cities.

Later life and death
By 1855, a tree was located at White's burial site in the eastern corner of the cemetery, and the same tree remained at his burial site in 1891. White was survived by his three sons, Robert, Alexander, and John, and his wife. His son, Dr. Robert White, Jr., inherited the White family farm following White's death.

Marriage and children
White married Margaret Hoge, the eldest daughter of his uncle William Hoge and his wife, Barbara Hume. White and his wife, Margaret, had at least eight children together:

References

Bibliography

 
 
 
 
 
 
 
 
 
 
 
 
 
 
 
 
 
 
 

1688 births
1752 deaths
18th-century American physicians
18th-century Presbyterians
18th-century Scottish medical doctors
Alumni of the University of Edinburgh
American planters
American surgeons
British emigrants to the Thirteen Colonies
People from Frederick County, Virginia
People from Paisley, Renfrewshire
Physicians from Virginia
Presbyterians from Virginia
White, Robert 01
Royal Navy Medical Service officers
Scottish emigrants to the United States
Scottish Presbyterians
Scottish surgeons
Virginia colonial people
Virginia pioneers